Atlasjapyx is a genus of diplurans in the family Japygidae.

Species
 Atlasjapyx atlas Chou & Huang, 1986

References

Diplura